Democratic People's Party (Demokratische Volkspartei, DVP) was the name of two liberal parties in southern Germany. It is not to be confused with the Deutsche Volkspartei of 1918 which used the same abbreviation DVP.

In 1863–1866 a Demokratische Volkspartei or Württembergische Volkspartei established in the Kingdom of Württemberg, a more left liberal party descending from the German Progress Party of 1861. It became the Deutsche Volkspartei (German People's Party) for the regions of Southern Germany in 1868. In 1910 this party merged with two similar parties to the Progressive People's Party, Fortschrittliche Volkspartei. In 1918 it became the German Democratic Party, dissolved in 1933.

After Second World War liberals in the State of Württemberg-Baden refounded a party with the name Demokratische Volkspartei. In 1948 it joined with other state parties in the Free Democratic Party. For historical reasons the state party in Baden-Württemberg still uses the old name together with the national name (FDP/DVP).

Defunct political parties in Germany
Political parties established in 1945
Political parties established in 1863
Liberal parties in Germany
1863 establishments in Germany
Political parties disestablished in 1866
1866 disestablishments in Germany
1945 establishments in Germany
Political parties disestablished in 1948
1948 disestablishments in Germany
Radical parties